Jake Upfield (born 18 May 1995) is an Australian rugby union player, currently playing for the . His preferred position is lock or flanker.

Early career
Upfield graduated Bond University in 2017, before moving to the UK.

Professional career
Upfield joined Jersey Reds in 2017. He remained with the side until 2021 when he returned to Australia to continue his studies.

Ahead of the 2023 Super Rugby Pacific season, Upfield was called into the  squad as it suffered with injuries in the lock position.

References

External links
itsrugby.co.uk Profile

1995 births
Living people
Australian rugby union players
Rugby union locks
Rugby union flankers
Jersey Reds players
Queensland Reds players